The first season of the American television series Burn Notice originally aired from June 28, 2007, to September 20, 2007.

Season overview 
The first season of Burn Notice introduces Michael Westen. He is burned while on a covert operation in Nigeria. After fleeing, he soon finds himself in Miami, where he is reunited with his ex-girlfriend, Fiona Glenanne, and another old friend, Sam Axe. With his entire life in ruins and his former employers refusing to answer the phone to him, Michael begins the hunt for the man who signed the order to burn him, with his biggest source of trouble and information being the government agents assigned to monitor him. In addition to hunting for the people who burned him, Michael works as a freelance spy, helping people with cases involving kidnapping, arms dealers, con artists, and drug traffickers.

For several episodes, Michael is tailed by Harris (Marc Macaulay) and Lane (Brandon Morris), two FBI agents who are sent to keep tabs on Michael and to whom Sam reports due to them threatening his pension, mildly straining his relationship with Michael. Eventually after Sam "finds" a document in Michael's possession that he should not have, Harris and Lane are pulled from the case and replaced by a CSS agent, Jason Bly (Alex Carter). Bly makes Michael's life miserable, even going so far as having his loft raided and his car towed.

Michael returns the favor by making Bly's life miserable, such as breaking into his hotel room and concealing a magnet near his government laptop to destroy the memory core. Eventually, Michael reveals he has created falsified documents detailing that Bly and he are criminal partners (partially helped by Bly repeatedly entering his loft without legal permission or reason), and blackmails Bly into providing Michael with a copy of the dossier on Michael's Burn Notice: the document that details why he lost his job. Finally, Michael discovers the identity of the man who burned him: Phillip Cowan (Richard Schiff). Unable to leave Miami without alerting every agency, Michael gets Cowan's attention by having input on the FBI WatchList after arranging for the Head of the Libyan Secret Police to send Cowan a fruit basket.

He gets in touch with Cowan, and they eventually meet. Cowan laughs that Michael thinks that [Cowan] is solely responsible for destroying his career because of a name on a document, and cryptically reveals that he works for a much more powerful entity. However, Cowan is shot by a sniper after saying "This is much, much bigger than us, my friend." Michael is later contacted by a mysterious woman (later identified as Carla), who tells him that they should meet. Michael suspects that she is part of the organization that burned him, and he makes a long journey to meet her. The season ends with Michael driving onto a truck to be taken to his new "handler".

Cast

Main 
 Jeffrey Donovan as Michael Westen
 Gabrielle Anwar as Fiona Glenanne
 Bruce Campbell as Sam Axe
 Sharon Gless as Madeline Westen

Recurring 
 Seth Peterson as Nate Westen
 Paul Tei as Barry Burkowski  
 Marc Macaulay as Agent Harris
 Brandon Morris as Agent Lane  
 Audrey Landers as Veronica
 Alex Carter as Jason Bly 
 Richard Schiff as Phillip Cowan  
 China Chow as Lucy Chen  
 Chris Ellis as Virgil Watkins

Characters

Jeffrey Donovan was cast as burned spy Michael Westen. Gabrielle Anwar was given the role of ex-IRA operative Fiona Glenanne. The character of Sam Axe, an ex-Navy SEAL, was given to long-time action star Bruce Campbell, while Sharon Gless was given the part of Michael's hypochondriac mother, Madeline Westen.

Various recurring characters made appearances throughout the season. Paul Tei portrayed Barry Burkowski, a money-launderer. Seth Peterson was cast as Michael's brother, Nate Westen. Two FBI agents in charge of Michael's case at the beginning of the season, Agents Harris and Lane, were played by Marc Macaulay and Brandon Morris, respectively. Audrey Landers made various appearances as Sam's "lady-friend", Veronica. Alex Carter portrayed the difficult Agent Jason Bly. Phillip Cowan, the man who wrote Michael's burn notice, was portrayed by Richard Schiff. A former associate of Michael's, Lucy Chen, was played by China Chow. Characters that would return in later episodes, the drug-dealing Sugar, client Virgil Watkins, and heroin dealer Carmelo, were played by Arturo Fernandez, Chris Ellis, and Todd Stashwick, respectively. Other prominent guests included Steven Bauer, Arye Gross, Lucy Lawless, Esai Morales, Mark Pellegrino, Dedee Pfeiffer, and Ray Wise.

Episodes 

Notes

  The pilot was originally produced to be shown as a two-hour movie or as two one-hour episodes. When USA decided to broadcast it uninterrupted, it was edited to fit a 90 minute time slot; this version is also on the Season 1 DVD. The two-part version was eventually shown in Australia, and is now on PlutoTV More Drama channel.
  "Fight or Flight" was originally intended for broadcast after episode "Old Friends", however these episodes were slightly re-edited and shown in reverse order.
  "Dead Drop" and "Loose Ends" were shown as one continuous two-hour finale, but originally produced to be aired as two separate episodes. "Dead Drop" is sometimes referred to as "Loose Ends", Part I.
  Season One was originally broadcast in 1.33:1 (full screen) format. Beginning with the June 5, 2008 rebroadcast of "Wanted Man", the show began airing in 1.78:1 (widescreen) format.

References

External links 
 

2007 American television seasons